Henry Roy Waite (October 3, 1884 - December 18, 1978) was an aviation pioneer. He was one of the first aircraft inspectors for the United States Navy. He later restored the Wright Flyer for display in the Smithsonian.

Biography
He was born on October 3, 1884 in Boston, Massachusetts to Julia C. and Horace Waite. He died on December 18, 1978 in Winthrop, Massachusetts .

References

Aviation pioneers
Members of the Early Birds of Aviation
1880s births
1978 deaths